The Sieve of Eratosthenes is a 1999 sculpture by Mark di Suvero, installed on the Stanford University campus in Stanford, California, United States.

History
The artwork was added to Stanford's collection in 2000. It was dedicated to John Henry Merryman on his 80th birthday.

In 2014, the  sculpture was relocated from outside the Cantor Arts Center to the lawn between Escondido and Meyer Library.

See also

 1999 in art

References

1999 establishments in California
1999 sculptures
Outdoor sculptures in California
Stanford University buildings and structures
Works by Mark di Suvero